Mouly Ieng (born 1950, Prey Veng Province) is a Cambodian politician.

Biography
He graduated from the Cambodian Business School of the Royal Phnom Penh University. Went to the CNAM-INTEC in Paris, France. He worked with the Prime minister Hun Sen. Mouly was vice president of the Buddhist Liberal Democratic Party. He was Minister of Information in the 1993 coalition government. Mouly challenged Son Sann for the leadership of the party but did not win election. He founded the Buddhist Liberal Party in 1998, which failed to win any seats in the 1998 elections. Now he is working with the government of Cambodia as a senior minister at the Council of Ministers.

References

External links
https://thediplomat.com/2015/07/innovative-program-brings-hiv-testing-to-cambodia/
http://www.khmertimeskh.com/news/14737/---cambodia-shifts-to-multi-party-democracy---/
https://www.cambodiadaily.com/news/using-condoms-evidence-police-flout-law-118612/
http://www.phnompenhpost.com/national/malaria-money-available-global-fund-dispute-ends
http://www.khmertimeskh.com/news/14744/arrests-of-sex--workers-surge/
http://www.phnompenhpost.com/analysis-and-op-ed/hiv-cambodia
https://www.cambodiadaily.com/news/hiv-infection-rate-down-but-govt-can-do-more-experts-101698/
https://www.cambodiadaily.com/archives/mystery-hiv-outbreak-sparks-panic-in-battambang-74328/

1950 births
Living people
Government ministers of Cambodia
Buddhist Liberal Democratic Party politicians
Cambodian Buddhists
People from Prey Veng province